Depressaria despoliatella is a moth in the family Depressariidae. It was described by Nikolay Grigoryevich Erschoff in 1874. It is found in Turkmenistan.

References

Moths described in 1874
Depressaria
Moths of Asia